Sikhanwala (Urdu,) is a town of Sahiwal District in the Punjab province of Pakistan. It is located at 30°29'0N 72°38'0E with an altitude of 156 metres (515 feet). Neighbouring settlements include Asghari and Tirathpur.

References

Populated places in Sahiwal District